The Gipuzkoa autonomous football team was the regional football team for the province of Gipuzkoa, Spain, active between the 1910s and the 1930s. They were never affiliated with FIFA or UEFA, because Gipuzkoa is represented internationally by the Spain national football team.

History

Early history
Gipuzkoa's first recorded game was held at San Mamés on 13 December 1914 against Biscay, and they lost 2–1. Patricio Arabolaza was the scorer of the first goal in the team's history. A month later they faced Biscay again, this time at the Atotxa Stadium, and won comfortably 4–0. Although the Basque provinces of Gipuzkoa and Biscay were both organising their own representative matches occasionally, their players formed a combined 'North' team from the regional championship of that name (which also included Cantabria, but was usually dominated by players from those two Basque provinces), which evolved into the Basque Country team. This Basque/North side participated in the first edition of the Prince of Asturias Cup, an official inter-regional tournament organized by RFEF, at Madrid in 1915 and won the title after beating the Catalan team 1–0 with a goal from Juan Legarreta, then holding Centro (a team formed by players from the centre of Spain) to a 1–1 (the Basque goalscorer being Gipuzkoa's Patricio). Gipuzkoa took on Catalonia four times in friendlies at the end of 1915, with a draw and a narrow loss in Barcelona, followed by a big win (5–1) in San Sebastián and then an equally heavy defeat (4–0) in Irun. In May and June of 1916, "Team North" faced Catalonia three times, winning by 3–1 away and 5–0 at home with a goalless draw in between. Patricio again scored in both victories, netting four times in the latter. The great Pichichi scored his only goal for the team in one the 3–1 win.

After several disagreements between the clubs of Biscay and Gipuzkoa, which had caused there to be no Basque representation under any banner at the next three Prince of Asturias Cup tournaments and culminated in a pivotal North Championship match between Athletic Bilbao (Biscay) and Real Sociedad (Gipuzkoa) being abandoned, in 1918 the National Committee of the Spanish federation agreed to divide the Northern Federation in these two regions. Thus, Gipuzkoa formed its own federation and launched their own championship in the 1918–19 season.

The Gipuzkoa team participated in both the 1922–23 and the 1923–24 editions of the revived Prince of Asturias Cup, being knocked out by Catalonia in the quarter-finals on both occasions. In the latter, they managed to score a goal in a 2–1 loss, their only goal in the competition as a separate entity; the scorer was René Petit.

Revival
In 2013, a match was staged between the amateur teams of Biscay and Gipuzkoa (which continue to operate provincial football leagues at the seventh level of the pyramid and below) resulting in a 1–1 draw, won by Biscay on penalties, to commemorate the centenary of the Biscay Federation (taking its foundation date as that of the North Federation), as had also taken place in 1964 for the 50th anniversary (6–0 to Biscay).

The centenary of the Gipuzkoa Federation occurred in 2018, but the organisers opted for a conventional friendly between its two biggest clubs – Real Sociedad and SD Eibar – to mark the occasion rather than any match involving representative teams; that was also the case for the 50th anniversary in 1968, when Real Sociedad played twice against Alavés.

Results

Table

Notable players
  Patricio Arabolaza
  René Petit

See also
:Category:Sportspeople from Gipuzkoa

References 

 

Football in the Basque Country (autonomous community)
Spanish autonomous football teams
Sports organizations established in 1914
1914 establishments in Spain
Representative teams of association football leagues
Sport in Gipuzkoa